Dianne Kirksey (also known as Dianne Kirksey-Floyd) (1950 – 1 September 2020) was an African-American filmmaker, writer, producer, and actress in New York City. Her productions have been nominated for a combined 16 Audelco Awards. Kirksey was an activist and educator, and she received the honorary rank of Lieutenant Colonel in the Alabama State Militia in 1985 for her leadership and service to the state.

Early life 
Dianne Kirksey was born in Eutaw, Alabama, United States, to Wiley Kirksey, a former school superintendent in Greene County, Alabama and Gladys Kirksey, an educator. Kirksey was active in several local plays and productions as a child. As a student leader during the Civil Rights Movement, she led marches and protests through Greene County in support of the Voters' Rights Act. She graduated Carver High School in 1967.

Education 
Kirksey matriculated at the University of Alabama in the fall of 1967. As a freshman, she was the first Black student named "Bama Belle" and first Black member of the homecoming court. She was a founding member of the UA African American Association (renamed the Black Student Union), the first Black woman to be an officer of the Associated Women's Students organization, and led the Institutional Racism Workshop at the UA International Women's Conference. She graduated with a double major in Theater and English in 1973.

Since her graduation, she has been honored by the university for contributions to racial and gender equality, listed as one of the most important black alumni by AL.com. In 2018, she was one of twenty Female Trailblazers celebrated at the UA 1893 Jubilee Dinner celebrating 125 years of women admitted to the University.

Career 
Kirksey has been active in education, film, television and theater as a classroom teacher, director, and actress since 1973. She studied at the New York University Intensive Filmmaking Program under Thierry Pathe. Recently, she has produced a short film, Sweet Dreams, Momma and a short documentary, Bama's Black Babies Are Dying, and was developing a series of TV and film projects.

Her notable acting roles include portraying Cheryl in Ron Milner's Urban Transitions: Loose Blossoms opposite Chadwick Boseman, produced by Woodie King, Jr. Kirksey has also earned roles in film and television, including Doctors, One Life to Live, Rich Kids, directed by Robert M. Young and The Marva Collins Story, starring Morgan Freeman and Cicely Tyson.

Kirksey has also served two terms on New York City's Community Board 8 on the Education Committee.

Death

Kirksey died in New York on September 1, 2020.

Education 
She taught third and fifth grades at PS 334 from 2006 - 2019.

Film and television 

† Pre-production
‡ Post-production

Theatre

Actress

Director

Awards 

 Trailblazer, University of Alabama 1893 Jubilee Dinner, 2018
Finalist, New York Television Festival Pitch Competition, 2017
 Honoree, Blackboard Awards, 2011
 Opening Doors, University of Alabama, 2003
 Fellow, Korea Institute, 2002
 Fellow, China Institute, 2001
 Invitee, Cannes Film Festival, 1987
 Honorary Lieutenant Colonel, Alabama State Militia, 1985

References 

2020 deaths
African-American actresses
African-American film directors
1950 births
Actresses from New York City
Film directors from New York City
People from Eutaw, Alabama
Actresses from Alabama
University of Alabama alumni
20th-century African-American people
20th-century African-American women
21st-century African-American people
21st-century African-American women